Mark Ivey (born July 11, 1973) is an American football coach who is currently the linebackers coach at the University of Louisville. A longtime high school football coach in Florida, he joined the college coaching ranks at his alma mater, Appalachian State, in 2012, serving as their interim head coach in 2018 when Scott Satterfield departed to be the head coach at Louisville. He followed Satterfield to Louisville in 2019 to serve as his defensive line coach.

Coaching career

High school coaching
After graduating from Appalachian State in 1996, Ivey coached the freshman offensive and defensive line at Port Charlotte High School in Florida. He spent the 1997 season at Cape Coral High School as an assistant, before going on to coach the offensive line and serve as the defensive coordinator at Gulf Coast High School. He was also the head coach at Cypress Lake High School and Barron G. Collier High School from 2002 to 2006 and 2007 to 2011, respectively. At Barron Collier, he compiled a 36–19 record, led them to state playoff appearances all five years of his tenure, and won three consecutive district championships from 2007 to 2009.

Appalachian State
Ivey was named the outside linebackers coach and special teams coordinator at his alma mater Appalachian State in 2012, working under former teammate Scott Satterfield. He was reassigned to defensive line coach in 2014 and later added the title of assistant head coach in 2018.

Ivey was named the interim head coach in 2018 after Satterfield departed to take the head coaching job at the University of Louisville. He coached the team in their bowl game against Middle Tennessee, where the Mountaineers won by a score of 45–13. His interim tag was not removed at the end of the season, and Eliah Drinkwitz was hired to be the new head coach.

Louisville
Ivey was officially named the defensive line coach at Louisville in 2019, joining Satterfield once again.

Head coaching record

College

‡ Served as interim HC for bowl game

References

External links
 Louisville profile
 Appalachian State profile

1973 births
Living people
American football defensive linemen
American football linebackers
Appalachian State Mountaineers football coaches
Appalachian State Mountaineers football players
Louisville Cardinals football coaches
High school football coaches in Florida
People from Henry County, Virginia
Coaches of American football from Virginia
Players of American football from Virginia